

Oman
 Mombasa – 
Sa‘id al-Hadermi, Wali of Mombasa (1735–1739)
Muhammad ibn Uthman al-Mazru‘i, Wali of Mombasa (1739–1745)

Portugal
 Angola – Joaquim Jacques de Magalhães, Governor of Angola (1738–1748)
 Macau – D. Diogo Pereira, Governor of Macau (1738–1743)

Colonial governors
Colonial governors
1739